Rob Claeys (born 24 August 1987 in Belgium) is a Belgium football central defender who currently plays for SW Harelbeke. He joined in 2002, from F.C. Marke. His debut for K.V. Kortrijk A-team was 2006.

External links
 Guardian Football
 

1987 births
Living people
Belgian footballers
Belgian Pro League players
K.V. Kortrijk players
Sportspeople from Kortrijk
Footballers from West Flanders
Association football defenders